Alvarez is a guitar brand founded in 1965 by the owner and distributor St. Louis Music. Alvarez manufactures steel-strings, classical guitars, ukuleles and, for a time, solid and hollow-body electric guitars and basses.

History 
In the late 1960s, St. Louis Music's founder, Gene Kornblum, met Kazuo Yairi, a Master Luthier in Japan who produced handmade concert classical guitars. Together, St. Louis Music and the Yairi factory started to design and develop steel string acoustic guitars and imported them into the United States. The guitars took the brand name of St. Louis Music's Spanish guitar line “Alvarez”. Similar instruments were also sold under the factory brand of “K. Yairi” in Europe and other parts of the world.

From 2005 to 2009, the brand was owned by LOUD Technologies, which also owned Mackie, Ampeg, Crate and other music-related brands. In 2009, Mark Ragin (owner of US Band & Orchestra and St. Louis Music) brought the management and distribution of the guitars back to St. Louis Music. As early as 2011, SLM senior vice president Chris Meikle has acted as Alvarez head of development, overseeing the redesign of Artist Series and other models and rolling out new instrument lines such as the 2014 Masterworks Series, the Alvarez 50th anniversary 1965 Series, Alvarez-Yairi Honduran Series and the Grateful Dead Series.

While many of its models are produced in China, the top-tier Alvarez-Yairi instruments are handmade at the Yairi factory in Kani, Gifu-Japan, part of the legacy of Kazuo Yairi, the late master luthier. Every Alvarez guitar undergoes a full set up and inspection in their guitar shop in St. Louis, Missouri.

Series 

Alvarez Guitars manufactures many models of guitar which are categorized by price point and specialty into series.

Regent Series 
Alvarez considers Regent Series a high quality entry-level line of guitars designed to give younger players and players new to the instrument a positive learning experience. With one of the best of the series; the RD8, being discontinued. In 2018 Alvarez released the Regent School Series designed specifically for students. The nut width is slimmer than the standard size and the neck has been custom shaped to be comfortable for smaller hands.

Artist Series 
Alvarez has stated that its goal with Artist Series is to deliver pro level guitars at excellent value through the close attention to detail. Alvarez Artist Series has won several awards, including a 5/5 rating in Acoustic Guitar Magazine and a nomination for best guitar series from The Music and Sound Retailer. In 2017 Artist Series began adding new key features and models including armrests, travel guitars like the Delta DeLite and LJ2, and ATR (Advanced Tonal Response) system.

Masterworks Series 

In 2014 Alvarez introduced the Masterworks Series featuring all solid wood construction and high end appointments such as gold tuners, ebony bridge pins, mother of pearl inlays and maple or koa binding. In 2019 Alvarez introduced bluegrass focused Masterworks models, the MF60OM and the MD60BG, that feature construction that emphasizes response when playing with a plectrum and flatpicking.

Alvarez-Yairi Series 

Alvarez Yairi guitars are a handmade flagship series, crafted in the Yairi factory in Kani, Japan. Alvarez Yairi have been the guitar of choice for many professional touring musicians including Jerry Garcia, Bob Weir, Ani DiFranco, and Joe Bonamassa. Alvarez Yairi take the name of master luthier Kazuo Yairi(1932-2014) who partnered with St. Louis Music in the late 1960s to bring Alvarez Guitars to the market. Kazuo Yairi inspired many innovations that are still used in Alvarez guitars today, including the Direct Coupled Bridge, careful selection of tonewoods, and manual carving; a practice that he referred to as "listening with your hands". In 2017 the Alvarez team discovered a lost cache of Honduran Mahogany that Kazuo Yairi had purchased and stored on a plot of land near his factory in the mid 1970s. Tonewood that has been naturally seasoning for this amount of time is coveted by luthiers around the world, and this discovery led to the release of the Yairi Honduran line of guitars which debuted in 2018.

Alvarez Artists Past & Present 

Jerry Garcia
Raulin Rodriguez
Antony Santos
Devin Townsend
Bob Weir
Carlos Santana
Harry Chapin
Glen Hansard
Ani DiFranco
David Crosby
Graham Nash
Roy Muniz
Jon Anderson
Trevor Rabin
Pete Yorn
Jeff Young
G.C. Johnson
Joe Bonamassa
Shaun Morgan
Josh Turner
Monte Montgomery
Mike Inez
Miguel Dakota
Viktor Tsoi
Rick Droit
Mason Ramsey
Daniel Christian

Further reading

References

External links

 

Alvarez Guitars
Manufacturing companies based in St. Louis
LOUD Audio